American Quarterly is an academic journal and the official publication of the American Studies Association. The journal covers topics of both domestic and international concern in the United States and is considered a leading resource in the field of American studies. The current editor-in-chief is Mari Yoshihara (University of Hawaiʻi). The journal is published quarterly by the Johns Hopkins University Press. It has been promoting digital research and teaching.

Notes

External links
 
  American Quarterly on the Johns Hopkins University Press website
 American Quarterly  at Project MUSE
 American Studies Association

American studies journals
Publications established in 1949
Quarterly journals
English-language journals
Johns Hopkins University Press academic journals
Magazines published in Baltimore